СССР (Союз Советских Социалистических Республик, SSSR in Latin script) is a Russian abbreviation for the Soviet Union or Union of Soviet Socialist Republics (USSR).

CCCP may also refer to:

C.C.C.P. (band), a German synthpop group
CCCP Fedeli alla linea, an Italian band formed in 1982
California Code of Civil Procedure
Carbonyl cyanide m-chlorophenyl hydrazone, a toxic ionophore and decoupler of the respiratory chain
Combined Community Codec Pack, a software pack for Microsoft Windows to play multimedia content
3C-P, a psychedelic chemical compound
CCC Party, the Citizens Coalition for Change Party formed in Zimbabwe in 2022

See also
 USSR (disambiguation)
 CCP (disambiguation)
 SSSR (disambiguation)
 Soviet Union (disambiguation), including Sovetsky Soyuz